Sørvær Chapel is a chapel of the Church of Norway in Hasvik Municipality in Troms og Finnmark county, Norway. It is located in the village of Sørvær on the western tip of the island of Sørøya. It is an annex chapel for the Hasvik parish which is part of the Alta prosti (deanery) in the Diocese of Nord-Hålogaland. The white chapel, made of stone and wood, was built in a long church style in 1968 using plans drawn up by the architect Sverre Flåto. The church seats about 100 people.

History

The earliest existing historical records of the church date back to the year 1589, but the church was likely built much earlier. By 1697, the old church was quite dilapidated and so it was torn down and not replaced. After more than 250 years, a new chapel was built on the same site. The chapel was completed in 1968.

See also
List of churches in Nord-Hålogaland

References

Hasvik
Churches in Finnmark
Wooden churches in Norway
20th-century Church of Norway church buildings
Churches completed in 1968
1968 establishments in Norway
Long churches in Norway